Louis Gill may refer to:

Louis J. Gill (1940–2020), American politician
Louis John Gill (1885–1969), American architect